Decimiana elliptica is a species of praying mantis in the genus Decimiana in the order Mantodea. The type specimens were collected from the Chapanda Diamantina Mountain Range in Bahia, northeastern Brazil, near a mountain known as Morro do Pai Inácio.

References

Acanthopidae
Insects described in 2012
Insects of Brazil